Isabella of Burgundy (1270 – August 1323), Lady of Vieux-Château, was the second and last Queen consort of Rudolf I of Germany.

Life
She was the second daughter of Hugh IV, Duke of Burgundy and his second wife Beatrice of Navarre.

Isabella was betrothed in 1272 to Charles of Flanders. He was born in 1266 to the later Robert III, Count of Flanders and his first wife Blanche of Sicily. Her betrothed died in 1277.

On 6 February 1284, Isabella became the second wife of Rudolf I of Germany. The bride was fourteen years old and the groom almost sixty-six. Their marriage remained childless. Rudolph died on 15 July 1291. He was succeeded as Duke of Austria by his co-ruling sons Albert I and Rudolph II.

She returned to the Court of Burgundy and was granted the title of Lady of Vieux-Château on 20 November 1294.

She had a second marriage to Pierre IX de Chambly, Lord of Neaufles who died c. 1319. Isabella and Pierre had at least one daughter.

References

External links 
 
 
 Listing of male-line descendants of the Vienne family
 Listing of mae-line descendants of the Vergy family

1270 births
1323 deaths
House of Burgundy
German queens consort
Remarried royal consorts
13th-century French nobility
13th-century French women
13th-century German nobility
13th-century German women
14th-century French nobility
14th-century French women
14th-century German nobility
14th-century German women